WRHK 94.9 FM is a radio station broadcasting a classic rock format. Licensed to Danville, Illinois, the station is owned by Neuhoff Corp., through licensee Neuhoff Media Danville, LLC.

References

External links
WRHK's website

RHK
Radio stations established in 1992
1992 establishments in Illinois